Joseph Kreutzer (11 November 1790 – 16 June 1840) was a German composer, conductor, guitarist, and violinist. Kreutzer was born in Aachen, the son of a local music teacher. He lived in Düsseldorf from about 1805, where he established himself among the leading musicians of the city. He is known to have been a violin teacher to Norbert Burgmüller and probably concert master at the local theatre for a time. He died in Düsseldorf.

His compositions consisted mostly of chamber music and instructive pieces for bowed strings and guitar. It is for his charming though conservative guitar works that he is still being performed and recorded today. He also penned a lost symphony.

Works

Guitar
 6 Variations on a Theme from Weber's "Der Freischütz" op. 6 (for 2 guitars)
 6 Variations on a theme by Mozart op. 7
 Six Variations brillants über das Lied "A Schüsserl und a Reindl" op. 10
 Six Variations in C major op. 11
 Six Variations on "God Save the King" op. 12
 Variationen über das Lied "Kind willst du ruhig schlafen" aus Peter von Winters Oper "Das Opferfest" op. 13
 8 Variations in A major on a favourite Tyrolean song op. 14
 12 Pièces amusantes op. 17
 Trois Rondeaux op. 23
 6 Variations op. 24

Chamber
 Flute Quartet No 1 in D Major
 Flute Quintet No. 2 in C major
 Flute Quartet No 3 in G Major
 Quatuor brillant
 3 Rondos for Guitar op. 23
 Trio No. 1 in A Major for Flute, Violin and Guitar Opus 9
 Trio No. 2 in E Minor for Flute, Violin and Guitar Opus 9
 Trio No. 3 in D Major for Flute, Violin and Guitar Opus 9
 Trio No. 4 in C Major for Flute, Violin and Guitar Opus 9
 Trio for Flute, Clarinet and Guitar in three movements: I: Allegro risoluto; II: Adagio; III: Alla Polacca, Opus 16

References

External links
 Klaus Zehnder-Tischendorf comments on Joseph Kreutzer, one of Norbert Burgmüller's teachers
 [ Allmusic article on Joseph Kreutzer]
 Free scores by Joseph Kreutzer in the International Music Score Library Project

1790 births
1840 deaths
19th-century German composers
Composers for the classical guitar
German classical composers
German classical guitarists
German male guitarists
German violinists
German male violinists
German conductors (music)
German male conductors (music)
People from Aachen
German male classical composers
19th-century German male musicians
19th-century guitarists